Robert Booth may refer to:

People

Politicians
 Robert Booth (MP for Bodmin) (c. 1699–1733), English MP
Robert Booth (MP for New Shoreham) (fl. 1601), English MP
 Robert Booth (Australian politician) (1851–1901)
 Robert Coulter Booth (1846–1918), Australian politician

Other people
 Robert Booth (actor), British actor in Confessions from a Holiday Camp and The Lion, the Witch and the Wardrobe
 Robert Booth (priest) (1662–1730), Dean of Bristol
 Robert Booth (judge) (1626–1680), Lord Chief Justice of the King's Bench for Ireland
 Robert Booth (rower) (born 1964), Australian rower

 Bobby Booth (1890–?), English footballer
Robbie Booth (born 1985), English footballer

Characters
President Robert L. Booth, in Judge Dredd

See also
Sir Robert Gore-Booth, 4th Baronet (1805–1876)
Booth (surname)